Eric Binns (13 August 1924 – 20 September 2007) was an English professional footballer who played as a defender. During his career he played for Halifax Town, Burnley and Blackburn Rovers in the Football League and also had spells in non-league football.

Career
Born in Halifax, West Yorkshire, Binns started his footballing career as an amateur with Huddersfield Town before joining his home-town club Halifax Town in May 1946. He scored one goal in six league matches for the club but was released at the end of the 1946–47 campaign. Binns subsequently moved into non-league football with Goole Town but returned to the professional game two years later after being offered a contract by Football League First Division side Burnley following a successful trial period. He spent the first three years of his Burnley career playing solely in the club's reserve team, unable to displace first-team centre-half Tommy Cummings from his position.

Binns eventually made his first-team debut for the Lancashire club on 15 November 1952, deputising for the injured Jock Aird at right-back in the 1–0 home win over Aston Villa. He played twice more during the 1952–53 campaign, but remained primarily a reserve player during the remainder of his time with the club, appearing only when either Cummings or Aird were unavailable. In total, Binns played 15 matches in the Football League for Burnley in six seasons before transferring to local rivals Blackburn Rovers in May 1955. He spent two years with the Ewood Park club, playing 23 league matches during that time. Binns moved into non-league football with Runcorn in 1957 before retiring from the sport the following year.

After his retirement from football, Binns worked as a salesman and in 1977 he was appointed as the steward of Burnley Cricket Club.

References

1924 births
2007 deaths
Footballers from Halifax, West Yorkshire
English footballers
Association football defenders
Halifax Town A.F.C. players
Goole Town F.C. players
Burnley F.C. players
Blackburn Rovers F.C. players
Runcorn F.C. Halton players
English Football League players